"Lighthouse" is a song by Irish boy band Westlife and it is the lead single from their second compilation album Greatest Hits (2011). The song is their final physical single after their announcement to disband prior to their 2018 reformation. Also the single is the group's first and last physical single not under the tutelage of Simon Cowell, having left Syco and Cowell in March 2011. The song was written by Gary Barlow and John Shanks, and was released on 11 November 2011. A music video was filmed in South Africa and premiered on 20 October 2011.

The song debuted at number two on the UK Physical Singles Chart shortly after release. Overall, the song became their second-lowest charting single in Ireland and the United Kingdom, charting at number eleven and thirty-two respectively.

Background
It is described as an instantly recognisable Westlife classic complete with soaring melodies, rousing lyrics. Band members Mark Feehily and Nicky Byrne discussed the song during a behind-the-scenes look at the music video shoot. They explained, "We were excited to be working with 'the competition'. It's the first time that someone like Gary has written a song for a group in competition with his own. Him and John wrote Patience for Take That, so we are confident that we have a great team of writers. Some people think that we regard Gary as an enemy, but we don't at all. It's cool that he's written a song for us." Shane Filan also stated, "I love the idea of Gary writing a song for us. He's thrown all the rules out of the window"."Lighthouse" was chosen by the record label instead of another new album track, "Beautiful World". It was due to be the lead single from their forthcoming compilation but at the last minute they ditched the song in favour of the latter. Mark said: "It was literally up until a day ago that we were deciding between 'Lighthouse' and 'Beautiful World' for the first single but they went with 'Lighthouse' in the end.", "It's one of the potential single track of the album", "I wasn't too gutted though. Once I write the song I've written it. You can't get too attached and just have to hand it over and forget the fact that you've written it." The band's manager Louis Walsh revealed later: "...And that song – well, Gary wrote that song for Elton John a few years ago. And he gave it to the producer, and the producer gave it to the guys because they didn't have anything else."

Release
The song received its first radio airplay on 30 September 2011, during the prime-time hour on LincsFM with Eddie Shaw. Shortly after the song was played, the hashtag #westlifelighthouse became a trending topic worldwide on Twitter. An official 90-second official preview of the song was released via SoundCloud on 4 October 2011. On 7 October 2011, the single's artwork was unveiled by the band's official website. On 14 October 2011, they launched a new pre-order system for the single by texting 'Westlife' to 80115. This service is only open to users in England and is not compatible with Apple iPhone handsets. The full, high quality radio edit of the song was posted on their YouTube site on 10 October 2011. The pre-order service was released on 23 October 2011.

Critical reception
Robert Copsey of Digital Spy claimed: "Earlier today, your trusty Digital Spy music scribes were played the new Westlife single, 'Lighthouse', in full, three times over, and at a perfectly respectable volume. The song is about how their partners have stuck by them through the difficult times and now they want to settle down with them for good. It's probably the most grown-up sounding single Westlife have ever released. "This kind of love is more than a lifeline/ For a man as weak as me," Shane Filan belts in the openings bars, over a soul-funk piano riff, before asking: "How did the sea get so rough?/ I would have drowned/ If you hadn't given me your love." The song's highlight is easily the middle eight, where a slew of thrashing drums clash together as they sing: "I owe it all to you/ Everything I have right now." Despite being their first release away from Syco, it would soundtrack a tearful X Factor moment rather nicely." Julia Simpson of Yahoo expressed: "Westlife are back with a brand new single so get ready to sway, and wave those lighters in the air. Yahoo were lucky enough to have a top secret first listen to their new track ‘Lighthouse’ in full yesterday. The track was literally carried to our office, played to us and then smuggled back in a secure operation which made us feel a bit like we were in a Bond film. And we can indeed confirm that it's the Irish boys back at their best. Think Elton John, pianos and romance as the song opens gently. But before long it gives way to a rich, uplifting chorus like some of Westlife's best ballads – but with a touch of Take That in there too. With lyrics like "For a man who rarely cried/I get all choked up inside" we can see ourselves kicking autumnal leaves as this blares out of our iPods. Rather like the video, by the looks of these brand new behind-the-scenes shots of their video shoot! Westlife fans, we challenge you not to like it". She added: "We reviewed the lads' brand new single Lighthouse and it made us feel all autumnal." 98fm.com expressed: "The song gives Westlife a more grown up feel and it reminds me of the sort of song you’d hear on an X Factor package about the contestants!"

The start of Westlife's final run of singles. Truth be told, we'd been taking them for granted these last few years; a staple of the November singles and album charts and, like the red cups at Starbucks, a friendly reminder that the festive season was upon us. In fact, like a mug of their Christmas blend, you could always expect the group's output to be a relaxing, chest-warming and thoroughly wholesome affair. Their latest is just that: an assured, safe-as-houses slice of midtempo pop penned by hitmaker-of-the-moment Gary Barlow that sits perfectly alongside their record-breaking streak of Top 10 hits – including 14 (14!) number ones. "This kind of love is more than amazing/ For a man who lost his way," Shane admits over a bouncy piano riff before insisting they're ready to settle down with their partners on the sing-songy chorus. The thing we'll miss most? Those flawless key changes." Bukisa.com added: Lighthouse is a classic Westlife anthem. It may not be the usual slow-tempo ballad but you will feel the touch of Westlife with the piano intro, uplifting choruses, soaring melodies, powerful post middle-8 key change and harmony-filled split vocals of Shane and Mark backed by Kian and Nicky. The simple but stunning video filmed in South Africa and inspirational lyrics are just added attraction. The artwork is perfect for the end of their career as a band, as you see the sunset in the background. The B-side is called "Poet’s Heart" which is another classic. Westlife always gives their best in every single they release and Lighthouse is no-doubt an addition.

EF gave it  saying, Lighthouse is written by Gary Barlow and John Shanks and sees Westlife attempt something a little more uptempo. Whilst the early promise indicates the track is a departure for the band, it soon becomes apparent that Lighthouse fits neatly next to their other material. The harmony-filled chorus is classic Westlife and the vocal split between Shane and Mark keeps to the tried-and-tested formula. Whilst hardly new ground for Westlife, Lighthouse allows the group to play to their strengths. Their fans have loved the fact that the band rarely step out of their comfort zone so they should lap up this single. Honestly we think it's time Westlife called it a day and it'll be interesting to see what the four members do next.

Chart performance
In Ireland, "Lighthouse" debuted at number eleven, becoming their second lowest-charting single in the country. The song debuted at number thirty-two on the UK Singles Chart, with first-week sales of 11,006 copies. The following week the song fell to number eighty-nine. It is their lowest-charting single in the United Kingdom, and their first single not to chart within the top 10.

Music video
Filming for the music video of the first single began on 17 September 2011 and was shot in South Africa also like the album photoshoot. Three official video stills were posted on the band's Twitter account on 4 October 2011. The behind-the-scenes video premiered exclusively on their Vevo account on 5 October 2011, was deleted two days later but resurfaced at the same account on 13 October 2011.

The video made its premiere on Chart Show TV and on their YouTube site on 20 October 2011.

Track listing
CD single / EP / digital download / digital audio bundle
 "Lighthouse" – 4:22
 "Poet's Heart" (or "A Poet's Heart") (John Shanks, Ruth-Anne Cunningham) – 3:57

Charts

Sales

Release history

References

Westlife songs
2011 singles
Pop ballads
Songs written by Gary Barlow
Songs written by John Shanks
Song recordings produced by John Shanks
2010s ballads
2011 songs
RCA Records singles
Sony Music singles
Sony BMG singles